United Nations Security Council Resolution 2051 was unanimously adopted on 12 June 2012.

See also 
List of United Nations Security Council Resolutions 2001 to 2100

References

External links
Text of the Resolution at undocs.org

2012 United Nations Security Council resolutions
2012 in Yemen
United Nations Security Council resolutions concerning Yemen
June 2012 events